Timothy Dale Scott (born November 16, 1966) is an American former Major League Baseball right-handed pitcher.

Career
Drafted by the Los Angeles Dodgers in the 2nd round of the 1984 MLB amateur draft, Scott made his Major League Baseball debut with the San Diego Padres on June 25, 1991. His final game in the major leagues came on July 2, 1997. His first professional season was in 1984, playing for Los Angeles' rookie league Great Falls Dodgers. He played his last professional season in 2001, playing for the New York Yankees' Triple-A Columbus Clippers.

External links

1966 births
Living people
Albuquerque Dukes players
American expatriate baseball players in Canada
Bakersfield Dodgers players
Baseball players from California
Colorado Rockies players
Colorado Springs Sky Sox players
Columbus Clippers players
Great Falls Dodgers players
Las Vegas Stars (baseball) players
Louisville RiverBats players
Major League Baseball pitchers
Montreal Expos players
Nashville Sounds players
Sacramento Steelheads players
San Diego Padres players
San Antonio Dodgers players
San Antonio Missions players
San Bernardino Stampede players
San Francisco Giants players
Solano Steelheads players
Sonoma County Crushers players
Vero Beach Dodgers players
People from Hanford, California